Wang Zuanxu (王纘緒) (June 2, 1885 – November 1960) was a Kuomintang general from Sichuan.

References
Biography of Wang Zuanxu

External Links
https://www.hoover.org/news/hoover-acquires-personal-papers-wang-zuanxu-nationalist-chinese-military-leader-sichuan

1885 births
1960 deaths
National Revolutionary Army generals from Sichuan
Politicians from Nanchong
People's Republic of China politicians from Sichuan